Rhagoletis berberis is a species of tephritid or fruit fly in the family Tephritidae. This species feeds on species of the genus Mahonia such as mountain grape and Oregon grape.

References

berberis